Arrif Tammurt neɣ (Arabic: الريف موطننا) was the National Anthem of the Republic of the Rif from 1921 to 1926.

Lyrics

References

Historical national anthems
Rif